This is the list of diplomatic missions of Kuwait. Kuwait maintains more than 100 diplomatic missions.

Africa

 Algiers (Embassy)

 Porto-Novo (Embassy)

 Djibouti (Embassy)

 Cairo (Embassy)

 Addis Ababa (Embassy)

 Libreville (Embassy)

 Accra (Embassy)

 Nairobi (Embassy)

 Tripoli (Embassy)

 Nouakchott (Embassy)

 Rabat (Embassy)

 Abuja (Embassy)

 Dakar (Embassy)

 Pretoria (Embassy)

 Khartoum (Embassy)

 Dar es Salam (Embassy)

 Tunis (Embassy)

 Harare (Embassy)

Americas

 Buenos Aires (Embassy)

 Brasilia (Embassy)

 Ottawa (Embassy)

 Santiago de Chile (Embassy)

 Havana (Embassy)

 Mexico City (Embassy)

 Washington, D.C. (Embassy)
 Los Angeles (Consulate-General)
 New York City (Consulate-General)

 Caracas (Embassy)

Asia

Yerevan (Embassy)

 Baku (Embassy)

 Manama (Embassy)

 Dhaka (Embassy)

 Thimphu (Embassy)

 Bandar Seri Begawan (Embassy)

 Phnom Penh (Embassy)

 Beijing (Embassy)
 Guangzhou (Consulate-General)
 Hong Kong (Consulate-General)
 Shanghai (Consulate-General)

 New Delhi (Embassy)
 Mumbai (Consulate)

 Jakarta (Embassy)

 Tehran (Embassy)

 Baghdad (Embassy)
 Basra (Consulate-General)
 Erbil (Consulate-General)

 Tokyo (Embassy)

 Amman (Embassy)

 Astana (Embassy)

 Vientiane (Embassy)

 Beirut (Embassy)

 Kuala Lumpur (Embassy)

Ulaanbaatar (Embassy)

 Yangon (Embassy)

 Muscat (Embassy)

 Islamabad (Embassy)
 Karachi (Consulate-General)

 Manila (Embassy)

 Doha (Embassy)

 Riyadh (Embassy)
 Jeddah (Consulate-General)

 Singapore (Embassy)

 Seoul (Embassy)

 Colombo (Embassy)

 Damascus (Embassy)

 Bangkok (Embassy)

 Ankara (Embassy)

 Abu Dhabi (Embassy)
 Dubai (Consulate-General)

 Tashkent (Embassy)

 Hanoi (Embassy)
 Ho Chi Minh City

 Sana'a (Embassy)

Europe

Tirana (Embassy)

 Vienna (Embassy)

 Brussels (Embassy)

 Sarajevo (Embassy)

 Sofia (Embassy)

 Nicosia (Embassy)

 Prague (Embassy)

 Paris (Embassy)

 Berlin (Embassy)
 Frankfurt (Consulate-General)

 Athens (Embassy)

 Budapest (Embassy)

 Dublin (Embassy office)

 Rome (Embassy)
 Milan (Consulate-General)

 Valletta (Embassy)

 The Hague (Embassy)

 Warsaw (Embassy)

 Lisbon (Embassy)

 Bucharest (Embassy)

 Moscow (Embassy)

 Belgrade (Embassy)

 Bratislava (Embassy)

 Madrid (Embassy)

 Stockholm (Embassy)

 Berne (Embassy)

 Kyiv (Embassy)

 London (Embassy)

Oceania

 Canberra (Embassy)

 Wellington (Embassy)

Multilateral organisations
 Cairo (Delegation to the Arab League)
 Geneva (General Delegation to the United Nations and other international organisations)
 New York (Permanent Mission to the United Nations)
 Paris (Permanent Delegation to UNESCO)

Gallery

Non-resident embassies

See also

Foreign relations of Kuwait

References

 Ministry of Foreign Affairs - Kuwaiti missions abroad

 
Diplomatic missions
Kuwait